Katherine Neville may refer to:
Katherine Neville (author) (born 1945), American author
Katherine Neville, Duchess of Norfolk (c.1397 – c.1483), eldest daughter of Ralph Neville and Joan Beaufort
Katherine Neville, Baroness Hastings (1442–1504), daughter of Richard Neville and the sister of Warwick the Kingmaker